The Qinshan railway station is a railway station of Xi'an–Baoji High-Speed Railway located in Qishan County, Shaanxi, China.

Buildings and structures in Shaanxi
Railway stations in Shaanxi
Stations on the Xuzhou–Lanzhou High-Speed Railway